Rory Enrique Conde (born June 14, 1965), a.k.a. "The Tamiami Trail Strangler", is a Colombian-born serial killer who killed six prostitutes in Florida, U.S. over a span of 5 months from September 1994 to January 1995. He was sentenced to death on March 7, 2000, and has been on the Florida death row since.

Personal life
Rory Conde was born on June 14, 1965 in Barranquilla, Colombia. His mother died of tetanus when he was six months old. Conde and his sister Nelly were then raised by their paternal grandmother. When Conde was twelve, they moved to Miami to live with Conde's father, Gustavo Conde. Conde did not like his father and thought he was emotionally abusive. Conde's future wife, Carla Conde, thought that Rory's outbursts were a result of sexual abuse at the hands of his father.

Rory and Carla were married in 1987, when he was 21 and she was 15, eventually having two children. Rory was an abusive husband and had a stint in jail in 1992 as a result of a fight with Carla over Rory bringing girls over. They later moved to a condo off the Tamiami Trail.

They stopped having sex and Rory would disappear at night. In July 1994 Carla moved out to her parents' house with their two children. Rory threatened to kill her if she dated anyone else.

Murders
On September 17, 1994, Conde killed cross dressing male prostitute,  Lazaro Comesana. He later said that he killed Lazaro after finding out he was a man during sex.

Conde then killed two more prostitutes, Elisa Martinez on October 8 and Charity Nava on November 20. On the back and buttocks of Charity he wrote "THIRD! (A happy face dotting the 'i') I will call Dwight Chan 10. (A reference to WPLG anchor Dwight Lauderdale) [See] if you can catch me. (Using two eyes instead of the word 'See')"

Conde then killed three more prostitutes: Wanda Crawford on November 25, Necole Schneider on December 17, and  Rhonda Dunn on January 12, 1995.

He strangled his victims to death and then anally raped the corpses afterward.

Aftermath
Conde was arrested on June 19, 1995 when Gloria Maestre, a prostitute he had bound head to toe, made enough noise to attract neighbors while Conde was in court for a shoplifting charge.

He was sentenced to death on March 7, 2000 for the murder of Rhonda Dunn. He later pleaded guilty to the murder of five others and was sentenced to five consecutive life terms without parole on April 5, 2001.

See also 
 List of serial killers in the United States

References

1965 births
1994 murders in the United States
1995 murders in the United States
20th-century criminals
American people convicted of murder
American prisoners sentenced to death
American serial killers
Colombian emigrants to the United States
Colombian people convicted of murder
Colombian prisoners sentenced to death
Crimes against sex workers in the United States
Living people
Male serial killers
Necrophiles
People convicted of murder by Florida
Prisoners sentenced to death by Florida